Field Marshal Sir Robert Rich, 4th Baronet (3 July 1685 – 1 February 1768) was a British cavalry officer. As a junior officer he fought at the Battle of Schellenberg and at the Battle of Blenheim during the War of the Spanish Succession. He was then asked to raise a regiment to combat the threat from the Jacobite rising of 1715. He also served with the Pragmatic Army under the Earl of Stair at the Battle of Dettingen during the War of the Austrian Succession. As a Member of Parliament he represented three different constituencies but never attained political office.

Career

Born the son of Sir Robert Rich, 2nd Baronet and Mary Rich (née Rich, daughter of Sir Charles Rich, 1st Baronet), Rich was commissioned as an ensign in the 1st Regiment of Foot Guards and lieutenant in the Army on 10 June 1700.

He fought in the War of the Spanish Succession at the Battle of Schellenberg in July 1704, where he was wounded, and at the Battle of Blenheim in August 1704, where he was wounded again. Promoted to lieutenant in the Brigadier-General Tatton's Regiment and captain in the Army, he succeeded his brother Charles as 4th Baronet in October 1706, and was then promoted to captain in the 1st Regiment of Foot Guards and lieutenant-colonel in the Army in March 1708. In June 1708 he fought a duel with Sir Edmund Bacon, 4th Baronet who was wounded but survived.

When the threat of the Jacobite rising of 1715 became apparent Rich was asked to raise a regiment which subsequently became known as the 18th Dragoons. That year he was also elected Member of Parliament for Dunwich. In June 1717 he was stripped of his regiment for voting against the Government on a motion accusing Lord Cadogan of fraud and embezzlement during the transport of some Dutch troops. He was defeated in the general election in 1722 but having strongly supported Sir Robert Walpole, firstly when Walpole was in opposition and then when Walpole was in the Government, was rewarded with the colonelcy of the 13th Hussars in November 1722.

He was elected as Member of Parliament for Bere Alston in February 1724 and became colonel of Sir Robert Rich's Regiment of Dragoons in September 1725. In 1727 he changed constituency to become Member of Parliament for St Ives and was appointed a Groom of the Bedchamber to King George II, a position he held until 1759.

Having been promoted to brigadier-general on 15 March 1727, he went on to be colonel of The King's Regiment of Carabineers in January 1731, colonel of the 1st Troop Horse of Grenadier Guards in July 1733 and, finally, colonel of the 4th Regiment of Dragoons in May 1735.

Promoted to major-general on 18 December 1735 and lieutenant general on 17 July 1739, Rich became Governor of the Royal Hospital Chelsea in May 1740. He served with the Pragmatic Army under the Earl of Stair at the Battle of Dettingen in June 1743 during the War of the Austrian Succession. He also presided over a court martial of Lieutenant-General Thomas Fowke, Governor of Gibraltar, on a charge of disobeying orders in August 1756.

Rich was promoted to general of horse on 24 March 1746 and to field marshal on 3 December 1757. In retirement he continued to live in the family home, Roos Hall in Beccles. He died on 1 February 1768.

Family
In 1710 Rich married Elizabeth Griffith; they had three sons, including Sir Robert Rich, 5th Baronet and Sir George Rich, 6th Baronet, and one daughter, Elizabeth, who married George Lyttelton, 1st Baron Lyttelton.

References

Sources
 
 

|-

|-

 
|-

1685 births
1768 deaths
4th Queen's Own Hussars officers
8th King's Royal Irish Hussars officers
13th Hussars officers
17th Lancers officers
Baronets in the Baronetage of England
British field marshals
British Life Guards officers
Carabiniers (6th Dragoon Guards) officers
Members of the Parliament of Great Britain for Bere Alston
British Army personnel of the War of the Austrian Succession
Robert
Members of the Parliament of Great Britain for constituencies in Cornwall
British MPs 1715–1722
British MPs 1722–1727
British MPs 1727–1734
British MPs 1734–1741
Freemasons of the Premier Grand Lodge of England
Military personnel from Suffolk
People from Beccles